Janice Lynn Kuehnemund (November 18, 1953 – October 10, 2013) was an American lead guitarist who founded the all-female hard rock/glam metal band Vixen.

Life and career
Born in St. Paul, Minnesota, Kuehnemund formed an all-female band known as Genesis in St. Paul in 1971, initially as a quintet under the name Lemon Pepper. Her father Carl served as a roadie during her band's earliest days. Genesis was later renamed Vixen to prevent confusion with the same-named English band before breaking up in 1974. A bandmate of hers during that year was Nancy Shanks. After a six-year hiatus she reformed Vixen and shortly moved her band to Los Angeles in 1981, and, in 1983, singer Janet Gardner joined her. The band gained notice by appearing in the 1984 teen film Hardbodies under the on-screen name Diaper Rash. They were also a quintet at the time. She eventually added Roxy Petrucci on drums and fellow Minnesotan Share Ross, then known as Share Pedersen, on bass, the lineup that signed to EMI Records. They released their self-titled debut, Vixen, in 1988. It was released by Manhattan Records in the U.S. and Canada. The band toured with the Scorpions, Ozzy Osbourne, and Bon Jovi, and appeared in Penelope Spheeris' 1988 film, The Decline of Western Civilization Part II: The Metal Years, although only Gardner, Pedersen, and Petrucci appeared in the film.

The album Rev It Up followed in 1990, along with tours with Kiss and Deep Purple. The band's album sales declined and they were dropped from their record label. Vixen disbanded in 1991, but formed again in 1997 without Kuehnemund, while she was working on side project Drawing Down the Moon. Kuehnemund sued and won the rights to the band's name, after she realized that the rest of Vixen left her out and usurped her right to represent them. She then continued the band in 2001 with new members, and toured and released Live & Learn in 2006. Gardner, Petrucci, and Ross (née Pedersen) formed their own band JanetShareRoxyGina (aka JSRG) with 1997 Vixen guitarist Gina Stile. The group's most well-known lineup did briefly reunite in 2004 to perform for VH1's Bands Reunited.

Kuehnemund's side project Drawing Down the Moon which featured her on guitar, Jackie Paulson on vocals, Stacy Robinson on vocals and percussion, Donna Eveland on drums, bass, and keyboards, Donna Rawlins on guitar and vocals, and Christine Perior as a touring bassist, released their debut and only studio album Angel in My Dream on November 2, 2004.

Kuehnemund died in Colorado Springs, Colorado, at age 59, on October 10, 2013, after a nine-month-long battle with cancer. Gardner, Ross, and Petrucci claimed a reunion was in the works until Kuehnemund's diagnosis which she never disclosed publicly and after her death they decided to use the Vixen name again "in her honor". In a 2011 interview then-frontwoman Jenna Sanz-Agero confirmed that a second album featuring the 2001 line-up was in the works and revealed the existence of a track called "I Understand" along with other new recordings and outtakes from Live & Learn. These recordings are unlikely to be ever released due to Vixen not having a single member from Kuehnemund's 2001–13 line-up anymore.

Discography
Vixen
Vixen (1988)
Rev It Up (1990)
The Best of Vixen: Full Throttle (1999)
Live & Learn (2006)
Extended Versions (2006)
Live in Sweden (2013)
Rare Vintage (2018)

Jeff Paris
Lucky This Time (1993) ("State of the Heart" only)

Drawing Down the Moon
Angel in My Dream (2004)

References

External links

 Jan Kuehnemund memorial page at VixenOfficial.com
 2009 interview at Free! Magazine
 2012 interview at Love-It-Loud.com, archived at the Wayback Machine
 2011 audio interview on YouTube
 Final August 31, 2013 audio interview on YouTube

1953 births
2013 deaths
American heavy metal guitarists
Glam metal musicians
American women heavy metal singers
American hard rock musicians
American pop rock singers
Lead guitarists
Musicians from Saint Paul, Minnesota
Deaths from cancer in Colorado
Singer-songwriters from Minnesota
Guitarists from Minnesota
Vixen (band) members
American people of German descent
American women singer-songwriters
American rock songwriters
20th-century American women guitarists
20th-century American guitarists
21st-century American women guitarists
21st-century American guitarists
20th-century American women singers
21st-century American women singers
20th-century American singers
21st-century American singers